Ridderkerk is a town and municipality in the western Netherlands, in the province of South Holland.

The municipality of Ridderkerk also includes the following towns, villages and townships: Bolnes, Oostendam, Rijsoord and Slikkerveer.

Ridderkerk has a museum called De Oudheidkamer, about the history of the town. 

The Centre of Ridderkerk has a central square for events and there is a theater.

Public transport
Waterbus
 At the Waterbus stop "de Schans" you can board the number 20 Waterbus to Dordrecht, Papendrecht, Hendrik Ido Ambacht, Alblasserdam, Krimpen aan den IJssel or Rotterdam.
 At the Waterbus stop "de Schans" you can also take line 6 to: Krimpen aan de Lek and Kinderdijk.
Buses
 The bus services are mostly operated by RET and they go to Rotterdam, Barendrecht and Dordrecht. There are two Arriva bus services to Zwijndrecht and Hendrik Ido Ambacht.

Topography

Topographic map of the municipality of Ridderkerk

Notable people 

 Leen van der Waal (1928–2020), politician, former Member of the European Parliament
 Jan van der Graaf (1937–2022), church administrator
 Rien Kaashoek (born 1937), mathematician and academic
 Luuk Kroon (1942–2012), naval officer, Commander of the Royal Netherlands Navy 1995-1998 
 Bas Belder (born 1946), politician, former Member of the European Parliament
 Lee Towers (born 1946), singer
 Gert Oostindie (born 1955), historian and professor
 Martin van Beek (1960–2018), politician, former senator
 Robbert Dijkgraaf FRSE (born 1960), mathematical physicist and politician, string theorist and minister
 Jos Wienen (born 1960), politician, former alderman of Ridderkerk, mayor of Haarlem 
 Johan Schot CBE (born 1961), historian working on science and technology policy
 Cora van Nieuwenhuizen (born 1963), politician, former minister
 Flora Lagerwerf-Vergunst (born 1964), judge and politician, former senator
 Bart Jan Spruyt (born 1964), historian, journalist and conservative writer
 Liesbeth Zegveld (born 1970), lawyer, legal expert and professor

Sport 
 Gerrit Lagendijk (1941–2010), professional football player and agent
 Wietske de Ruiter (born 1970), female former field hockey striker, team bronze medallist at the 1996 Summer Olympics
 Maurice Lim (born 1984), figure skating champion
 Jordy Buijs (born 1988), footballer, over 250 club caps
 Kevin Strootman (born 1990), footballer, nearly 300 club caps
 Bart Deurloo (born 1991), male artistic gymnast
 Tim Eekman (born 1991), professional footballer, almost 200 club caps
 Mick van Buren (born 1992), footballer, 150 club caps

Gallery

References

External links

Official website 

 
Municipalities of South Holland
Populated places in South Holland
IJsselmonde (island)